Killed or Cured is the fourth album by The New Amsterdams recorded during the breakup of The Get Up Kids and released via the internet in part in 2005 and in full in 2006 on Vagrant Records.

Writing
The album was originally recorded after Worse for the Wear, the band's third album. It was written primarily in 2004 after the release of The Get Up Kids album Guilt Show while that band was on its world tour. Several songs, chiefly "Wears so Thin" and "Watch the World Cave In" were written about the tensions in the band at the time that led to the group's eventual breakup. In fact, the song "Drinking in the Afternoon" was written in a hotel room during the Japan leg of the tour the night before Pryor quit the band after the tour was over. The events surrounding the album's writing led to a much darker and foreboding tone than on previous releases.

Production
After The Get Up Kids went on hiatus after their 2004 world tour, Pryor turned his focus to The New Amsterdams, who started recording the first version of Killed or Cured. They initially recorded a more stripped-down acoustic version of the album, with many songs featuring only Pryor on vocals and guitar. In 2005, The Get Up Kids formally announced their breakup, and that they would be doing one final tour before splitting up permanently on June 2. Because of this Vagrant Records, the label to which both The Get Up Kids and The New Amsterdams were signed, wanted to hold off on the release of Killed or Cured, as it would reflect poorly on The Get Up Kids due to the mood of when it was written.

Soon afterward, the band released the album online for free download, including cover art, from the band's website. They also returned to the studio to re-record the album for its retail release. The new version of the album is substantially different from the original, with each song featuring the full band and, in some cases, strings and brass. This new version was produced by Ed Rose, a longtime friend who had also produced several albums by The Get Up Kids, as well as other side-projects like Reggie and the Full Effect and White Whale.

In 2006, The New Amsterdams announced that they would release the album on two discs. The first disc, called "Killed" would feature the original, stripped down version of the album, and the second disc ("Cured") would feature the new re-worked versions of the songs. The album was eventually released on April 24, 2007.

Track listing

Personnel

Band
Matt Pryor - Vocals, Guitar
Bill Belzer - Drums
Eric McCann - Upright Bass
Dustin Kinsey - Guitar
Zach Holland - Keyboard

Production
Roget Moutenout - Producer, Mixing
Colin Mahoney - Engineer, Mixing
Roger Moutenot - Mixing
Ed Rose - Engineer

Design
Geoff McCann - Artwork
Matthew Doyle - Artwork

Killed or Cured Appendix

In 2006, the band released Killed or Cured Appendix, a six-song EP composed of B-sides left over from the Killed or Cured recording sessions on their website. It included new songs, alternate takes, and a cover. Some were full-band songs, whereas others were just demos that Matt Pryor recorded on his own.

Killed or Cured Appendix track listing

References

2006 albums
The New Amsterdams albums
Vagrant Records albums
Albums produced by Roger Moutenot